Francesco Piccolomini (22 October 1582 – 17 June 1651) was an Italian Jesuit, elected the eighth Superior-General of the Society of Jesus.

After Vincenzo Carafa, the 7th Superior General of the Order, died on 8 February 1649, a General Congregation made of representatives of the various Jesuit provinces, met on 21 December of the same year and chose Piccolomini as his successor. He died after eighteen months in office.

Before his election as General he had been professor of philosophy at the Roman College; he died at the age of sixty-nine, having passed fifty-three years in the Society.

References 
 

1582 births
1651 deaths
Piccolomini, Francisco
Francesco
17th-century Italian Jesuits